{{speciesbox
| fossil_range = Zanclean to Gelasian ~4.5 Ma to 1.8 Ma
| image =
| genus = Ostrea
| species = compressirostra
| authority = (Say, 1824)
| subdivision_ranks = Subspecies
| subdivision = O. c. geraldjohnsoniO. c. brucei}}Ostrea compressirostra'' is a species of prehistoric  saltwater oyster, a fossil that is found in the Yorktown Formation, Chowan River Formation, Waccamaw Formation, and their equivalents in Virginia, North Carolina, South Carolina, and Georgia (U.S. State).

References

Ostrea
Bivalves described in 1824